The Longer Sukhāvatīvyūha Sūtra (or Infinite Life Sutra, Chinese: Fóshuōwúliàngshòujīng 佛說無量壽經; Vietnamese: Phật Thuyết Kinh Vô Lượng Thọ; Japanese: Taisho Tripitaka # 360) is one of the two Indian Mahayana sutras which describe the pure land of Amitābha. Together with the Shorter Sukhāvatīvyūha Sūtra, this text is highly influential in China and Japan where it is revered by the Jōdo-shū and Jōdo Shinshū congregations.

History and translations
Some scholars believe that the Longer Sukhāvatīvyūha Sūtra was compiled in the age of the Kushan Empire in the first and second centuries by an order of Mahīśāsaka monastics who flourished in the Gandhāra region. It is likely that the longer Sukhāvatīvyūha owed greatly to the Lokottaravāda sect as well for its compilation, and in this sūtra there are many elements in common with the Mahāvastu. The earliest of these translations show traces of having been translated from the Gāndhārī language, a prakrit used in the Northwest. It is also known that manuscripts in the Kharoṣṭhī script existed in China during this period.

Traditionally the Longer Sukhāvatīvyūha Sūtra is believed to have been translated twelve times from the original Sanskrit into Chinese from 147 to 713 CE. Of those, only five translations are extant in the Chinese Buddhist canon. The earliest of the five translations is attributed to Zhi Qian, who came from the Kuṣāṇa kingdom to Luoyang during the decline of the Han dynasty and translated the sūtra sometime between 223 and 253 CE. This translation is known most commonly as Dà Āmítuófó Jīng (大阿彌陀佛經), or "Larger Sūtra of the Amitābha Buddha." This translation has also been attributed to the earlier Han period Kuṣāṇa translator Lokakṣema, who arrived in Luoyang in 164 CE and translated works through 186 CE.

The most well-known version of the Longer Sukhāvatīvyūha Sūtra is the two-fascicle Fó Shuō Wúliángshòu Jīng (Ch. 佛說無量壽經), which translates to "The Buddha Speaks of the Infinite Life Sūtra." This translation is traditionally attributed to the Indian Buddhist monk Saṅghavarman (Ch. 康僧鎧 Kāng Sēngkǎi), who translated the text in 252 CE at White Horse Temple in Luoyang, during the Three Kingdoms Period. However, the common opinion now is that it was more likely a work of the later Indian monk and translator Buddhabhadra (359-429 CE).

In addition to the Chinese translations, the Longer Sukhāvatīvyūha Sūtra is also extant in Sanskrit.

Contents

In the Longer Sukhāvatīvyūha Sūtra, the Buddha begins by describing to his attendant Ānanda a past life of the Buddha Amitābha. He states that in a past life, Amitābha was once a king who renounced his kingdom and became a bodhisattva monk named Dharmākara ("Dharma Storehouse"). Under the guidance of the buddha Lokeśvararāja ("World Sovereign King"), innumerable buddha-lands throughout the ten directions were revealed to him. After meditating for five eons as a bodhisattva, he then made a great series of vows to save all sentient beings, and through his great merit, created the realm of Sukhāvatī ("Ultimate Bliss"). This land of Sukhāvatī would later come to be known as a pure land (Ch. 淨土) in Chinese translation.

The sutra describes in great detail Sukhāvatī and its inhabitants, and how they are able to attain rebirth there. The text also provides a detailed account of the various levels and beings in the Mahāyāna Buddhist cosmology.

The sutra also contains the forty-eight vows of Amitābha to save all sentient beings. The eighteenth vow is among the most important as it forms a basic tenet of Pure Land Buddhism. This vow states that if a sentient being makes even ten recitations of the Amitābha's name (nianfo) they will attain certain rebirth into Amitābha's pure land.

Lastly the sutra shows the Buddha discoursing at length to the future buddha, Maitreya, describing the various forms of evil that Maitreya must avoid to achieve his goal of becoming a buddha as well as other admonitions and advice.

Sukhāvatīvyūha Sūtra Quotation on the Peace Bell at Hiroshima

A Peace Bell with an enclosure was constructed  in the Hiroshima Peace Memorial Park on September 20, 1964. Among its inscriptions is a Sanskrit quote from Sukhāvatīvyūha Sūtra:

The English translation (Müller, Max, trans. 1894):

The Chinese translation:

English Translations
 Gomez, Luis, trans. (1996), The Land of Bliss: The Paradise of the Buddha of Measureless Light: Sanskrit and Chinese Versions of the Sukhavativyuha Sutras, Honolulu: University of Hawaii Press
 
 Müller, Max, trans. (1894), The Larger Sukhāvatī-vyūha. In: The Sacred Books of the East, Volume XLIX: Buddhist Mahāyāna Texts, Part II. Oxford: Clarendon Press,

See also
 Shorter Sukhāvatīvyūha Sūtra (Amitabha Sutra)
 Sukhavati
 Amitābha
 Mahayana sutras

References

Bibliography
Nattier, Jan (2003). The Indian Roots of Pure Land Buddhism: Insights from the Oldest Chinese Versions of the Larger Sukhavativyuha, Pacific World (3rd series) 5, 179–201

Mahayana sutras
Pure Land Buddhism